The Getaway is singer Chris de Burgh's sixth original album, released on A&M Records in 1982. It was the first studio album of de Burgh's to chart in the UK, following the compilation Best Moves a year earlier. The album peaked at number 30 in the UK and spent 16 weeks on the chart. In the week beginning 7 February 1983, the album went to the top of the album charts in the then West Germany.

Background

The album was spearheaded by the U.S. top 40 hit, "Don't Pay the Ferryman", an upbeat, mythology-tinged pop rock song that evokes images of the Grim Reaper, which also became his first UK hit single, reaching number 48.

Another song from the album which has become a de Burgh fan-favourite is "Borderline", the story of a conscientious objector who chooses to flee with his lover than be drafted for military service.  A staple of de Burgh's live act, the song's story was continued in 1986's "Say Goodbye to It All" from the later album Into the Light.

Drums on the album were played by Steve Negus of the Canadian progressive rock band Saga.

Some of the guest vocalists were Anthony Head, Diane Davison (Chris de Burgh´s wife) and Miriam Stockley (who also collaborated with Mike
Oldfield on the album The Millennium Bell (1999).

Track listing
"Don't Pay the Ferryman" – 3:48
"Living on the Island" – 3:31
"Crying and Laughing" – 4:33
"I'm Counting on You" – 4:27
"The Getaway" – 3:52
"Ship to Shore" – 3:49
"All the Love I Have Inside" – 3:18
"Borderline" – 4:37
"Where Peaceful Waters Flow" – 3:54
"The Revolution" – 1:46
"Light a Fire" – 2:08
"Liberty" – 5:02

The Japanese CD splits the last three tracks differently:

10. "The Revolution" – 3:54
11. "Light a Fire" – 4:30
12. "Liberty" – 0:31

All compositions by Chris de Burgh.

Personnel 

 Chris de Burgh – lead and backing vocals, 6 and 12-string guitars, acoustic piano (8)
 Phil Palmer – acoustic and electric guitars
 Tim Wynveen – acoustic and electric guitars (2, 3, 11, 12), additional vocals
 John Giblin – bass guitar, fretless bass
 Nigel Warren-Green – cello (4)
 Rupert Hine – synthesizers, percussion, orchestral arrangements, backing vocals
 David Caddick – acoustic piano (4)
 Steve Negus – drums
 Anthony Thistlethwaite - saxophones
 Stephen W. Tayler – saxophones, woodwinds
 Anthony Head – voice (1)
 Diane Davison – additional vocals
 Miriam Stockley – additional vocals
 Sue Wilkinson – additional vocals

Production 

 Produced by Rupert Hine
 Engineered by Stephen W. Tayler
 Mastered by Bernie Grundman at A&M Studios (Hollywood, CA).
 Art Direction and Back Cover Photography – Michael Ross
 Inner Bag Photography – Fin Costello
 Illustration – Syd Brak
 Typography – Andrew Ellis
 Management – Dave Margereson and Kenny Thomson for Mismanagement, Inc.

Charts

Weekly charts

Year-end charts

Certifications and sales

References

Chris de Burgh albums
1982 albums
Albums produced by Rupert Hine
A&M Records albums